Tomaszkowo  is a village in the administrative district of Gmina Stawiguda, within Olsztyn County, Warmian-Masurian Voivodeship, in northern Poland. It is located in Warmia.

The village has a population of 541.

In 1518 the village was visited by Nicolaus Copernicus.

Notable people
  (1903–1982), Polish teacher and publicist in Warmia, imprisoned by the Germans in the Sachsenhausen concentration camp during World War II, was born in the village
  (1904–1972), member of the Sejm, Polish teacher in Warmia, imprisoned by the Germans in the Sachsenhausen concentration camp during World War II, was born and died in the village

References

Tomaszkowo